Arifur Rahman is a Bangladeshi footballer who last played as a winger for Chittagong Abahani in Bangladesh Football Premier League.

Club career

Early career
Arifur started his youth career in 2014 Bangladesh Pioneer League. He became top scorer of that season scoring 18 goals. Then he played in 2014 BFF U-18 Football Tournament for Dhaka Abahani U-18.

In 2015, he was trained in BFF Academy, Sylhet for seven months.

Dilkusha Sporting Club
After graduating from BFF Academy, Arif started his senior professional career in 2015 when he joined Dilkusha Sporting Club, a Dhaka Third Division Football League club. He got man of the match award 8 times in 2015-16 Dhaka Third Division League, highest than any other player of his team.

Victoria SC
In 2016, Arif joined Bangladesh Championship League side Victoria SC. He scored 6 goals in the league.

Chittagong Abahani
In 2017, Arifur joined country's top division side Chittagong Abahani to play in 2017-18 BPL. But he didn't made any appearance as there were so many star players in the club. He left the club in next transfer window after finishing first phase of the league.

Arambagh KS
In 2017, Arif moved to Arambagh KS, another top division side, from Chittagong Abahani. He had a dream journey with Arambagh KS as his career got a breakthrough under former Bangladesh national team head coach Maruful Haque here. He came to the limelight when his team won 2017 Independence Cup beating his previous team Chittagong Abahani & he became the best player of the tournament. It was Arambagh's first major domestic trophy of their history. Arifur performed consistently in next season too. He scored six goals in 2018-19 BPL including a hattrick. He scored a goal in the league running at 35.8 km per hour, faster than any other player of Bangladesh. His performance soon earned him a call from Bangladesh national team.

However, he left the club after spending two years as Arambagh faced some casino scandals.

Saif SC
In 2019, Arifur signed a one-year contract with Saif Sporting Club.

International career

Youth
Arifur played in 2013 SAFF U-16 Championship for Bangladesh U-16 national team.

Senior career
Arif made his senior debut against Laos during 2022 FIFA World Cup qualification match on 9 June 2019.

International Goals

References

Living people
1999 births
Bangladeshi footballers
Bangladesh international footballers
Association football forwards
Saif SC players
Arambagh KS players